Irene Fuhrmann (born 23 September 1980) is an Austrian football manager and a former player. She played mostly for USC Landhaus Wien, and was a member of the Austrian national team. She currently serves as the coach of the Austrian national team.

References

1980 births
Living people
Austrian women's footballers
Austrian football managers
USC Landhaus Wien players
Austria women's international footballers
Women's association football midfielders
ÖFB-Frauenliga players
Austria women's national football team managers
UEFA Women's Euro 2022 managers